1983 in philosophy

Events

Publications 
 Keiji Nishitani, Religion and Nothingness
 Benedict Anderson, Imagined Communities
 Vilém Flusser, Towards a Philosophy of Photography
 John Searle, Intentionality: An Essay in the Philosophy of Mind
 Peter Sloterdijk, Critique of Cynical Reason

Births

Deaths 
 July 1 - Buckminster Fuller (born 1895)
 October 17 - Raymond Aron (born 1905)
 December 21 - Paul de Man (born 1919)

References 

Philosophy
20th-century philosophy
Philosophy by year